This Song Doesn't End Here is an album by Turkish politician Recep Tayyip Erdoğan. It was released on 26 March 1999, the same day that Erdoğan, then mayor of Istanbul, went to prison due to statements he made during a speech in a public gathering in Siirt on 6 December 1997. The album includes seven poems and a song. İskender Ulus undertook the production of the album, which was released under the Ulus Music label.

On the back cover of the album it was reported that all of the royalties that Erdoğan received from this album would be donated to the families of martyrs, widows, orphans and  criminals of thought (via the Turkish Authors' Association). The album became the best-selling album of Turkey in 1999, selling over one million copies.

Track listing

See also 
 A Fairer World Is Possible

References

External links
 Bu Şarkı Burada Bitmez at Discogs

1999 albums
Turkish poetry
Recep Tayyip Erdoğan